Ranft is a surname. Notable people with the surname include:

Albert Ranft (1858–1938), Swedish theatre director and actor
Angela Ranft (born 1969), German cyclist
Bryan Ranft (1917–2001), British naval historian
Jerome Ranft, American character sculptor and voice actor
Joe Ranft (1960–2005), American screenwriter, animator, storyboard artist, director, voice actor and magician
Michael Ranft (1700–1774), German Lutheran pastor, writer, historian and expert on vampires
Richard Ranft (1862–1931), Swiss painter, engraver, illustrator and poster artist
Thomas Ranft (born 1945), German painter